Endochytrium is a genus of fungi in the family Endochytriaceae. The genus is widespread in temperate regions, and contains seven species.

References

External links

Chytridiomycota genera